Aughinish (sometimes written as Aughnish) (Eachinis in Irish) is a small island and townland located in Oughtmama Parish of the Barony of Burren in north County Clare, in Ireland on the south shore of Galway Bay. The island is approximately two miles (3 km) wide and a mile (1.6 km) from the northernmost tip to the southernmost point and has approximately fifty inhabitants.

The island was originally connected to County Clare, but that connection was lost due to the tsunami generated by the massive 1755 Lisbon earthquake. The British built the existing  causeway to County Galway to service their troops in the Martello Tower constructed on the island after 1811. To this day, land access to Aughinish, County Clare is still only through County Galway.

References

External links
Results of the 1901 Census for Aughinish

Further reading
 Glynn, Rose: The Story of Aughinish, 2002. (self-published)

Islands of County Clare
Tombolos